Mustilia phaeopera is a moth in the family Endromidae first described by George Hampson in 1910. It is found in Nepal and India.

The larvae feed on the leaves of Camellia species. They are broad and flattened in front, and tapering and cylindrical behind. There is a horn on the anal segment, which is bare and tan colored. The dorsum is darker with a dark olive spot at the anal end, and yellow spots on the sides. The entire body is spotted green. When the larva is disturbed, it draws its head in as far as it can. Pupation takes place in a dark brown cocoon which is pointed at one end and obtuse at the other.

References

Moths described in 1910
Mustilia